Codinaeopsin is an antimalarial isolated from a fungal isolate found in white yemeri trees (Vochysia guatemalensis) in Costa Rica.  It is reported to have bioactivity against Plasmodium falciparum with an IC50 = 2.3 μg/mL (4.7 μM). Pure codinaeopsin was reported to be isolated with a total yield of 18 mg/mL from cultured fungus.   The biosynthesis of codinaeopsin involves a polyketide synthase-nonribosomal peptide synthetase (PKS-NRPS) hybrid.

Biosynthesis

Formation of linear polyketide
The first step of the biosynthesis of codinaeopsin involves the assembly of the a linear polyketide by use of seven modules and incorporation of six methylmalonyl CoAs and one malonyl CoA by polyketide synthases (type I PKSs).

Formation of tetramic acid (2,4-pyrrolidinone)
L-Tryptophan is introduced by a nonribosomal peptide synthetase (NRPS) module and results in the central heterocyclic tetramic acid (2,4-pyrrolidinone).  The formal oxidation-reduction is found to be achieved by a series of tautomeric shifts involving enol and imine intermediates in the ring and consistent by discovery both C-2’ epimers.

Cyclization of PKS-assembled unit
The PKS unit is hypothesized to cyclize by a Diels-Alder-like addition similar to other natural products such as lovastatin and solanapyrone.

References 

Antimalarial agents